Wang Yinhang (born February 15, 1977) is a male Chinese race walker.

Achievements

References

1977 births
Living people
Athletes (track and field) at the 1998 Asian Games
Athletes (track and field) at the 2000 Summer Olympics
Chinese male racewalkers
Olympic athletes of China
Asian Games medalists in athletics (track and field)
Asian Games gold medalists for China
Medalists at the 1998 Asian Games